Hettinger Municipal Airport  is a public use airport located in Adams County, North Dakota, United States and owned by the Adams County Airport Authority.
The airport is one nautical mile (1.85 km) northwest of the central business district of Hettinger, North Dakota.

Although many U.S. airports use the same three-letter location identifier for the FAA and IATA, this airport is assigned HEI by the FAA but has no designation from the IATA (which assigned HEI to Heide-Büsum Airport in Heide, Germany).

Facilities and aircraft 
It has two runways: 12/30 is 4,652 by 75 feet (1,418 x 23 m) with an asphalt surface; 17/35 is 1,890 by 100 feet (576 x 30 m) with a turf surface.

For the 12-month period ending July 20, 2006, the airport had 2,830 aircraft operations, an average of 235 per month: 88% general aviation, 11% air taxi and 1% military. At that time there were 25 aircraft based at this airport: 96% single-engine and 4% multi-engine.

References

External links 
 Aerial image as of September 1995 from USGS The National Map
 

Airports in North Dakota
Buildings and structures in Adams County, North Dakota
Transportation in Adams County, North Dakota